Second Baptist School is a private primary and secondary Christian school in the Memorial area of Houston, Texas, United States.

SBS serves approximately 1200 students from PK3 – 12.

Notable Sports Achievements
 1990: Varsity Women's Volleyball team wins State
 1997: Varsity Men's Basketball wins first State Championship
 1999: Varsity Women's Tennis wins State Championship; Football wins first State Championship
 2000: Varsity Women's Tennis wins State Championship; Women's Cross Country wins State Championship; Varsity Men's Basketball wins State Championship
 2001: Varsity Women's Tennis wins State Championship; Women's Cross Country wins State Championship
 2002: Varsity Men's Baseball wins State Championship; Varsity Women's Volleyball wins State Championship
 2003: Varsity Women's Volleyball wins State Championship
 2004: Varsity Men's Swimming wins State Championship; Varsity Men's Baseball wins State Championship; Women's Cross Country wins State Championship
 2006: Varsity Men's Baseball wins State Championship; Varsity Men's Tennis wins State Championship
 2007: Varsity Women's Volleyball wins State Championship
 2011: Varsity Men's Swimming wins State Championship
 2012: Varsity Men's Swimming wins State Championship
 2016: Varsity Men's Swimming wins State Championship
 2018: Golf wins State Championship; Men's Basketball wins State Championship
 2019: Golf wins State Championship
 2021: Varsity Women's Softball wins first State Championship
 The SBS Baseball teams have been in 6 State Championships, 24 Regional Championships, and as of March 2021 there are 60 former eagles playing on a higher level
.

Notable alumni
Glenn January (Class of 2001), CFL player.
Aaron Thompson (Class of 2005), Major League Baseball player.
Ted Cruz, (Class of 1988), United States Senator from Texas.
 Jia Tolentino (Class of 2005), writer for The New Yorker.

See also
 Christianity in Houston

References

https://www.vype.com/Texas/Tx-Private-Schools/eagles-soar-to-tapps-division-ii-state-championship
https://www.vype.com/Texas/Houston/second-baptist-school-wins-tapps-division-ii-baseball-state-championship

External links

Baptist schools in the United States
Christian schools in Houston
Private K-12 schools in Houston